One by Two may refer to

 One by Two (1993 film) in the Telugu language
 One by Two (2014 film) in the Hindi language
 1 by Two, a 2014  Malayalam language film